David Dedek (born 25 January 1971) is a Slovenian professional basketball coach. He was most recently coaching DEAC until January 2023.

Education
After two years at primary school Toneta Tomšiča, Dedek moved to Primary School Franceta Bevka. From 1985 to 1989, he  attended Vegova Ljubljana, a high school in Ljubljana, Slovenia. In 1989, he enrolled into Fakulteti za elektrotehniko in računalništvo v Ljubljani. He continued his education at Fakulteta za šport, where he has finished his education at the top of his class.

Coaching career
His coaching career started back in 1988 when he was a coach of the U16 team at Ježica. He was coaching young players till 1995 when he became the head coach of the team. He was working in Slovenia for the next eight years. He came to Poland in 2003 joining Anwil Włocławek to won the Polish Basketball League title, the first championship in club history.
After Anwil Włocławek he was coaching Śląsk Wrocław, Asseco Prokom Gdynia, Start Gdynia and AZS Koszalin. Midseason 2016 he took over Start Lublin team. In the 4th season he led the team to 2nd place in PLK. In the 2022/23 season he continued his coaching career in Hungary at Debrecen EAC.

Awards

Individual awards
 1998 Basketball Coach of the year - ZKT Slovenije
 2014 Sportsman of the month (january) - trojmiasto.pl 
 2015 Sportsman of the month (may) - trojmiasto.pl 
 2014 Basketball Coach of the year - redakcja Sportowe Fakty 
 2014 Basketball Coach of the year - Radio Gdansk 
 2015 Basketball Coach of the year - Radio Gdansk 
 2020 Basketball Coach of the year - redakcja Polski Kosz 
 2020 Best Basketball coach - redakcja Polsat Sport 
 2020 City Lublin - Coach of The Year Award

References

External links

 Eurobasket profile
 KD Ježica profile

1971 births
Living people
Arka Gdynia basketball coaches
Slovenian basketball coaches
Sportspeople from Ljubljana
Start Lublin basketball coaches